The Pennsylvania Provincial Conference, officially the Provincial Conference of Committees of the Province of Pennsylvania, was a Provincial Congress held June 18–25, 1776 at Carpenters' Hall in Philadelphia. The 97 delegates in attendance (out of 103 appointed) involved themselves in issues relating to declaring Pennsylvania's support for independence and to planning for a subsequent gathering that would develop Pennsylvania's new Frame of Government. They achieved these objectives by formally:  
 Declaring Pennsylvania's independence from the British Empire, thus birthing the Commonwealth of Pennsylvania, 
 Mobilizing the Pennsylvania militia for the American Revolutionary War,
 Organizing elections to select delegates to a constitutional conventionwhich framed the Pennsylvania Constitution of 1776.

As the last holdout among the Thirteen Colonies to declare independence, the conference's actions had a profound impact on American public opinion and facilitated the issuing of the Declaration of Independence shortly afterward by the Continental Congress.

Delegates
Following is a list of those who attended the Pennsylvania Provincial Conference.

From Bedford County:
 David Davidson
 David Espy
 John Piper

From Berks County:
 Mark Bird
 Valentine Eckerd
 Henry Haller
 Joseph Hiester
 David Hunter
 Nicholas Lutz
 Jacob Morgan
 Bodo Otto
 Charles Shoemaker
 Benjamin Spiker

From Bucks County:
 Joseph Hart
 John Kidd
 Benjamin Single
 John Wallace
 Henry Wynkoop

From Chester County:
 Caleb Davis
 Evan Evans
 William Evans
 Samuel Fairlamb
 Lewis Grono
 Thomas Horkley
 Thomas Levis
 Colonel Hugh Lloyd
 William Montgomery
 John Morton
 Elisha Price
 Richard Reiley
 Richard Thomas

From Cumberland County:
 Hugh Alexander
 William Clark
 John M. Clay
 John Colhoon
 John Creigh
 William Elliot
 John Harris
 James M. Lane
 Hugh McCormick

From Lancaster County:
 William Augustus Atlee
 William Brown
 James Cunningham
 Bartram Galbraith
 Andrew Graaf
 David Jenkins
 Lodowick Lowman
 Alexander Lowrey
 John Smiley

From Northampton County:
 David Deshler
 Benjamin Dupue
 Nicholas Depue
 Neigal Gray
 Robert Severs
 John Wetzel

From Philadelphia:
 Jacob Barge
 John Bayard
 Joseph Brewster
 Samuel Brewster
 William Coates
 John Cox
 Joseph Dean
 Sharp Delany
 George Goodwin
 Francis Gurney
 William Lowman
 Christoper Ludwig
 Benjamin Loxley
 Christopher Marshall
 Timothy Matlack
 Thomas McKean
 Samuel Morris
 James Moulden
 James Mulligan
 Benjamin Rush
 George Schlosser
 Jacob Schriner
 Jonathan Bayard Smith

From Philadelphia County:
 Frederick Antes
 Mathew Brook
 John Bull
Enoch Edwards
 Henry Hill
 Robert Lewis
 Robert Loller
 Joseph Mather

From Westmoreland County:
 Edward Cook
 James Perry

From York County:
 Richard M. Chester
 James Egar
 David Kennedy
 Robert McPherson
 William Rankin
 James Read
 Henry Slagle
James Smith

See also
 Pennsylvania in the American Revolution
 111th Infantry Regiment, a U.S. National Guard unit, formerly Pennsylvania's Revolutionary War era militia
 Sweet Land of Liberty: The Ordeal of the American Revolution in Northampton County, Pennsylvania. By Francis S. Fox

References

External links 
 A Background to the Commonwealth of Pennsylvania, via ushistory.org

History of the Thirteen Colonies
History of Philadelphia
1776 in Pennsylvania
Pennsylvania in the American Revolution